Time Flies By is a double album by Country Joe McDonald. The 25 songs are covering 45 years of his songwriter activity. The singer and guitarist is accompanied by the Woodstock drummer Greg Dewey of Country Joe and the Fish, the bassist Tim Eschliman and several guest musicians.

Track listing

CD 1 
Write a Song
Sad and Lonely Times
Rainbow Stew
The Clone Song
Gunshot Wound
Section 43
All My Love in Vain
Rock Coast Blues
Katrina
I'm on the Road Again
Feels Like Heaven
Who Am I
Colorado Town
Dark Clouds
Plastic Bag

CD 2 
Peace on Earth
Yankee Doodle
Four More Years of Good Times
Rock and Roll Again
Trombone Blues
Eleventh Step
Plastic Dome
Feels Like Heaven II
Lady with the Lamp
Support the Troops
(Gunshots)
(Garbage Truck)
Write a Song II

Personnel
Country Joe McDonald - vocals, guitar, trombone, harmonica
Tim Eschliman - string bass also external link here
Greg Dewey - drums
Several guest musicians, Harper Simon, The Persuasions, Austin de Lone, Russ Gauthier, Ken Snakebite Jacobs, Suzy Thompson, Chris & Lorin Rowan and Bernie Krause.

External links
Allmusic
Country Joe McDonald's Website

2012 albums
Country Joe McDonald albums